The following is a list of Major League Baseball players, retired or active. As of the end of the 2018 season, there have been 580 players with a last name that begins with A who have been on a major league roster at some point.

A

Bold indicates an active player.

Notes

References

External links
Last names starting with A – Baseball-Reference.com

 A